
Below is a list of adaptations of works of Rabindranath Tagore in film and television.

Adaptations in film

Adaptations on television
In 2012 Hindi channel Doordarshan broadcast a 26-episode television series based the Tagore's novel Gora (1909) by producer Gargi Sen and director Somnath Sen.
 In 2015, Anurag Basu adapted many short stories of Tagore in a show titled Stories by Rabindranath Tagore, which was aired on EPIC channel. The 26-episode Season 1 was based on many famous short stories such as Chokher Bali, Atithi, Nastanirh, and Kabuliwallah among others.
 Directors Abhijit Guha and Sudeshna Roy ran a series of Tagore's stories titled Robi Thakurer Golpo, which was aired on Colors Bangla and was launched on 19 November 2015. Each story is shown in three episodes. The series consisted of more than a dozen stories, including Dena Paona, Shamapti, Kabuliwala, Postmaster, Khokababur Pratyabartan, Manihara, Jeebito Mrityu, Madhyabartini, Manbhanjan, Nastanirh, Strir Patra, Noukadubi and Chokher Bali, among others.

See also
 Works of Rabindranath Tagore
 List of works by Rabindranath Tagore

References

 
Filmographies
Indian filmographies